The Papua New Guinea men's national under-18 basketball team is a national basketball team of Papua New Guinea, administered by the Basketball Federation of Papua New Guinea "BFPNG".

It represents the country in international under-18 (under age 18) basketball competitions.

See also
Papua New Guinea men's national basketball team
Papua New Guinea women's national under-18 basketball team

References

External links
Papua New Guinea Basketball Records at FIBA Archive

Basketball teams in Papua New Guinea
Men's national under-18 basketball teams
Basketball